K. B. Desai (1897–1979) was an Indian medical doctor, a local leader of Congress from Navsari during the Indian independence movement, and a social reformer. He was a Gandhian.

Freedom struggle
Sardar Patel was imprisoned in the wake of Salt Satyagrah in 1930. Desai acted as spokesperson for Mahatma Gandhi in Navsari to organize local police as a strategy to help release Patel. He was imprisoned on multiple occasions for his role in the freedom struggle.

President of Navsari Municipal Council
After independence in 1947, he served as President of Navsari Municipal Council (Nagarpalika Pramukh).

Medical career
Desai graduated with an M.B.B.S. from Bombay (Mumbai) in 1922. He obtained further medical training from Dublin and Vienna. Desai provided surgical, obstetric, dental and non-surgical care. He built and ran K. B. Desai Hospital in Navsari, initially on his own, then with son Dipakbhai and daughter-in-law Sushilaben.

Social reform
Desai was active in social reform movements. He opposed the caste system, admitted patients of all castes to his hospital, and served food to them from one kitchen using one set of utensils.

References

Indian independence activists from Gujarat
1897 births
1979 deaths
Medical doctors from Gujarat
Anti-caste activists